Vrishasen Dabholkar is an Indian film actor born and brought up in Pune, Maharashtra.

About Vrishasen
Vrishasen Dabholkar first acted at the age of five when he played the role of Bal Shivaji in the famous Marathi play Janata Raja.

He has performed in theatre, serials and movies and has won several awards.

Most recently he played the central character named 'DJ' in Balaji Telefilms  Mission Dosti.com, a Marathi serial on Saam TV, which was a story of how social networking can be used by youth to help people in need.

Vrishasen was also the central character in the movie Dahavi Fa – a movie about the underdogs in the educational system, their anger and the channelisation of their violent attitude into a positive creative energy with the help of their teacher. In this movie he acted along with Atul Kulkarni, Jyoti Subhash, Milind Gunaji.

In his first year of college, he won the Purshottam award for his acting where he represented his almamater Fergusson College, Pune. Vrishasen has won the Shahu Modak Puraskar for his contribution towards theatre and films along with the Best Actor award in National level French play competition organised by the Embassy of France. Other than working with the likes of Amol Palekar for a theatre production named Julus, he has also prominent roles in hit Marathi films like Dahavi Pha, Nati Goti, Valu, Amhi Satpute, Tukaram to name a few and a cameo in Dhol by director Priyadarshan.

Vrishasen Dabholkar woke up to the ugly truth of female foeticide when he made his first documentary in college. A mass communication student, Vrishasen was introduced to Laadli- National Creative Excellence Awards for Social Change by his college after which he went ahead to win a category at the awards too.

Early life
Vrishasen has done BA in Political Science from Fergusson College, Pune and Masters in Communication Studies (MCMS) from University of Pune. He has also done a degree course in French from Ranade Institute, Pune.

Personal life
Vrishasen is the only son of Sanjay Dabholkar and Vrishali Dabholkar. Vrishasen married his girlfriend, Sharada Patil, on 19 November 2013.

Career

Films

Fiction shows

Non – Fiction shows 

Vrishasen, is an advertising professional currently working with a leading advertising agency. He has successfully converted his hobby of copy writing and creative advertising to a full-time profession in the last couple of years. He recently started a Facebook page and Insta account @chummachatting for sharing his "create-witty" with his fans through social media.

Awards

 Creative work on Print Advertisement featured in the prestigious Ads Of The Worlds 2017
 Winner of Suryadatta National Award for Young Achiever 2012
 Winner of UNFPA-Laadli National Creative Excellence Award for Social Change 2011 in the category of songs and lyrics ( Title -Song of Pronouns)
 Winner of UNFPA-Laadli National Creative Excellence Award for Social Change 2008 in the category of TVC/Films. (Title– La Fille)
 Winner of Sakaal Reflections PSA contest 2008
 Winner of Shahu Modak Puraskar 2004 for his contribution towards theatre and films

References

Year of birth missing (living people)
Living people
Indian male television actors